Nathicharami is a 2018 Indian Kannada-language film written by Sandhya Rani, directed by Manjunatha Somashekara Reddy (Mansore) and produced by M. Ramesh, under the banner Tejaswini Enterprises. Jaganmohan Reddy and Shivkumar Reddy are the other producers. The music of the film is scored by Bindhu Malini. The film stars Sruthi Hariharan and Sanchari Vijay with Sharanya, Poornachandra Mysore, Balaji Manohar and Gopal Deshpande in key roles. The sound design is done by Mahavir Sabbanavar and cinematography by Guruprasad Narnad. Manasa Mustafa has designed the costumes for the film.

The film had its world premiere in the India Story category and was nominated for the Oxfam Best film on Gender Equality Award at the 20th Jio MAMI Mumbai Film Festival.

Nathicharami won five awards at the 66th National film awards in 2019. National Award For Best Female Playback Singer went to Bindhu Malini for the song Mayaavi manave, Best Lyricist National Award for Manjunath S for the same song and Best editing national award went to Nagendra K Ujjani. The movie also won best Kannada film for the year. Shruthi Hariharan got special mention jury award for her performance.

Synopsis 
Nathicharami is about Gowri whose life is perplexed between her physical desires and emotional beliefs. The film narrates the struggles of the protagonist in a society that believes physical desires can only be followed by a nuptial. She is stuck in her ordinary life with people from her daily life pattern who talk about their notions that are in contrary to the other. Finally, when she feels that she has overcome her ambiguity, the situation takes a leap. The film also brings the audience's attention towards the nuances women from different walks of life face.

Cast 
 Sruthi Hariharan as Gowri
 Sanchari Vijay as Suresh
 Sharanya as Suma
 Poornachandra Mysore as Mahesh
 Balaji Manohar as Carvalho (Psychiatrist)
 Gopal Deshpande as Ravi
 Shantala as Jayamma
 Vallabha as Abhimanyu
 Greeshma Shridhar
 Harshil Koushik
 Dr. Seetha Kote
 Kalagangotri Manju
 Pradeep Shivamogga
 K J Pavan

Soundtrack

The film's score and soundtracks are composed by Bindhu Malini.

Accolades

References

External links 

Films whose editor won the Best Film Editing National Award
Best Kannada Feature Film National Film Award winners
2010s Kannada-language films